Lists of ancient tribes in the Balkans

List of ancient tribes in Thrace and Dacia
List of ancient tribes in Illyria
List of ancient Greek tribes

ancient tribes